The Fellows Baronetcy of Carshalton in the County of Surrey, was a title equivalent to a knighthood (but with succession rights) in the Baronetage of Great Britain created on 20 January 1719 for John Fellows or John Fellowes sub-governor and director of the South Sea Company. Because he was childless, the title became extinct on his death in 1724. After the death of royal physician Dr John Radcliffe, who has many institutions in Oxford named after him, Fellows purchased Carshalton House. The government confiscated its title as a result of the implosion of the South Sea Company in an investment catastrophe in 1721, but he continued to live there until his death in 1724.

Fellows baronets, of Carshalton (1719)
Sir John Fellows, 1st Baronet (–1724)

References
 

Extinct baronetcies in the Baronetage of Great Britain
1719 establishments in Great Britain